Pamela Lanman Guzzone (born January 4, 1963) is an American politician and management professional who is a member of the Maryland House of Delegates for District 13.

Background 
Guzzone graduated from Duxbury High School in 1981. She later attended Tufts University, where she received a Bachelor of Arts degree in English and political science in 1985, and the University of Maryland School of Public Policy, where she received a Masters of Public Policy degree in 1989.

Guzzone is a public management professional who worked for NASA's Goddard Space Flight Center until her retirement in 2019. She also previously worked as a community and civic activist, serving on her local parent–teacher association and working with the Domestic Violence Center of Howard County and other groups. Since her retirement, she has run a professional coaching and consulting firm.

In July 2004, Guzzone attended the Democratic National Convention as a national delegate pledged to U.S. Senator John Kerry. During the 2008 presidential primary elections, Guzzone supported former First Lady of the United States Hillary Clinton.

In December 2021, Guzzone filed to run for the Maryland House of Delegates in District 13, seeking to succeed retiring state delegate Shane Pendergrass. Before declaring her candidacy, she spoke to her ex-husband, Guy Guzzone (who currently represents the district in the Maryland Senate), who gave her advice on the prospect of running. She ran on a slate with Guzzone and incumbent state delegates Vanessa Atterbeary and Jen Terrasa during the primary election.

In the legislature 
Guzzone was sworn into the Maryland House of Delegates on January 11, 2023. She is a member of the House Health and Government Operations Committee.

Electoral history

References

External links
 

1963 births
21st-century American politicians
21st-century American women politicians
Democratic Party members of the Maryland House of Delegates
Living people
Tufts University alumni
University of Maryland, College Park alumni
Women state legislators in Maryland
People from Columbia, Maryland